Denni Aluseny Conteh (born 14 August 1975) is a Danish former journeyman football player of Sierra-Leonean descent and current coach.

He was from 2010 until October 2013 manager of the Danish female elite team of Ballerup-Skovlunde Fodbold.

References

External links
Danish national team profile
Homepage
 Boldklubben Frem profile 

1975 births
Living people
Danish people of Sierra Leonean descent
Association football forwards
Danish men's footballers
Denmark youth international footballers
Danish expatriate men's footballers
Boldklubben af 1893 players
Lyngby Boldklub players
Ølstykke FC players
Hvidovre IF players
RC Strasbourg Alsace players
Viborg FF players
Herfølge Boldklub players
Sparta Rotterdam players
FC Nordsjælland players
Odense Boldklub players
Molde FK players
Akademisk Boldklub players
Boldklubben Frem players
KÍ Klaksvík players
Expatriate footballers in Norway
Expatriate footballers in the Netherlands
Expatriate footballers in France
Danish Superliga players
Eliteserien players
Ligue 1 players
Eerste Divisie players
Association football midfielders
Footballers from Copenhagen